Backhouse is a surname, and may refer to:

Alfred Paxton Backhouse (1851–1939), Australian judge, son of Benjamin
Benjamin Backhouse (1829–1904), architect and politician in Australia
Constance Backhouse, CM OOnt FRSC (born 1952), a Canadian legal scholar and historian, specializing in gender and race discrimination,
Edmund Backhouse (1824–1906), English banker, J.P., and MP for Darlington; son of Jonathan Backhouse (1779–1842).
Sir Edmund Backhouse, 2nd Baronet (1873–1944), British would-be oriental scholar and literary forger; son of Jonathan Backhouse (1849–1918).
Elizabeth Backhouse (1917–2013), Australian novelist, scriptwriter and playwright
Flower Backhouse, Countess of Clarendon (d. 1700), First Lady of the Bedchamber; daughter of William Backhouse (1593–1662)
Frank Backhouse (1863–1933), mining engineer in Western Australia, son of Benjamin
James Backhouse (1794–1869), English botanist and Quaker missionary; a first cousin of Jonathan Backhouse (1779–1842)
James Backhouse (iv) (1825–1890), botanist, archaeologist, and geologist; son of James Backhouse (1794–1869)
Sir John Backhouse (1584-1649), English landowner and royalist; son of Samuel Backhouse (1554–1626)
Jonathan Backhouse (1779–1842), banker
Jonathan Backhouse (1849–1918), British baronet and banker; son of Edmund Backhouse (1824–1906)
Oliver Backhouse (1875–1943), British admiral; son of Sir Jonathan Backhouse (1849–1918)
Robert Backhouse (1854–1940), well-known horticulturist and British archer in the 1908 Olympics; great-nephew of Jonathan Backhouse (1779–1842).
Sir Roger Backhouse (1878–1939), British admiral of the Royal Navy, First Sea Lord 1939; son of Sir Jonathan Backhouse (1849–1918)
Roger Backhouse (economist), Professor of the History and Philosophy of Economics at the University of Birmingham
Samuel Backhouse (1554–1626), English merchant and politician
Tony Backhouse (born 1947), New Zealand musician
William Backhouse (1593–1662), English alchemist and teacher of Elias Ashmole; son of Samuel Backhouse (1554–1626)
William Ormston Backhouse (1885–1962), English agriculturalist and geneticist. Son of Robert Backhouse (1854–1940).